O Yong-seok (born 4 November 1969) is a South Korean speed skater. He competed in two events at the 1992 Winter Olympics.

References

External links
 

1969 births
Living people
South Korean male speed skaters
Olympic speed skaters of South Korea
Speed skaters at the 1992 Winter Olympics
Place of birth missing (living people)
Speed skaters at the 1990 Asian Winter Games
Medalists at the 1990 Asian Winter Games
Asian Games medalists in speed skating
Asian Games bronze medalists for South Korea